Alexandre Michel Gérard Desplat (born 23 August 1961) is a French film composer and conductor. He has won many awards, including two Academy Awards, for his musical scores to the films The Grand Budapest Hotel and The Shape of Water, and has received nine additional Academy Award nominations, ten César nominations (winning three), eleven BAFTA nominations (winning three), twelve Golden Globe Award nominations (winning two) and ten Grammy nominations (winning two).

Desplat has composed scores for a wide range of films, including low-budget independent productions and large-scale blockbusters, such as The Queen, The Golden Compass, Mr. Magorium's Wonder Emporium, The Curious Case of Benjamin Button, The Twilight Saga: New Moon, Fantastic Mr. Fox, Harry Potter and the Deathly Hallows – Part 1 & Part 2, Little Women, The King's Speech, The Danish Girl, The Imitation Game, Moonrise Kingdom, Argo, Rise of the Guardians, Zero Dark Thirty, The Midnight Sky, Godzilla, Philomena, Unbroken, The Secret Life of Pets, Isle of Dogs, The French Dispatch, and Guillermo del Toro's Pinocchio.

Early life 
Alexandre Desplat was born in Paris. His father, Jacques Desplat, was a Frenchman originally from Sarlat-la-Canéda. His mother, Katie Ladopoulou, is a Greek poet originally from Athens. Desplat's parents had met in the United States while they were both students at the University of California, Berkeley. They married in San Francisco and returned to France, settling in Paris. Alexandre has two older sisters, Marie-Christine (also known as Kiki) and Rosalinda.

Desplat began playing the piano at the age of five. He later picked up the trumpet, before switching to flute at nine. Desplat's musical interests were wide, ranging from French composers as Maurice Ravel and Claude Debussy, to jazz and world music. He developed an early appreciation for film music, courtesy of the movie soundtracks his parents brought back from the United States. He began collecting Bernard Herrmann's Hitchcock soundtracks as a teen and eventually decided to pursue a career as a film composer after hearing John Williams's Star Wars score in 1977. Other early sources of Desplat's inspiration include the music of Maurice Jarre, Nino Rota and Georges Delerue.

Desplat studied at the Conservatoire de Paris under Claude Ballif. During this period, he also took a summer course under Iannis Xenakis. Desplat also studied under Jack Hayes in Los Angeles. After leaving the Conservatoire, the then 20-year-old Desplat joined a theatrical troupe, where he wrote and played music.

When recording the music for his first film, he met violinist Dominique Lemonnier, who became his favorite soloist and artistic director. They later married.

Desplat has worked on many films since the 1980s. His big Hollywood break came in 2003 with the soundtrack for the film Girl with a Pearl Earring, a drama set in 17th-century Delft exploring a fictional muse of Vermeer.

Career 
Desplat has composed extensively for French cinema, Hollywood, and incidental music for over 100 films, including Lapse of Memory (1992), Family Express (1992), Regarde Les Hommes Tomber (1994), Les Péchés Mortels (1995), César-nominated Un Héros Très Discret (1996), Une Minute de Silence (1998), Sweet Revenge (1998), Le Château des Singes (1999), Reines d'un Jour (2001), the César-nominated Sur mes lèvres (2002), Rire et Châtiment (2003), Syriana (2005), the César-winner The Beat That My Heart Skipped (2005), The Queen (2006), Fantastic Mr. Fox (2009), Harry Potter and the Deathly Hallows – Part 1 (2010), The Ghost Writer (2010), Daniel Auteuil's remake of La Fille du Puisatier (2011), Harry Potter and the Deathly Hallows – Part 2 (2011) and The Grand Budapest Hotel (2014).

Desplat has composed individual songs that have been sung in films by such artists as Akhenaton, Kate Beckinsale, Charlotte Gainsbourg, Valérie Lemercier, Miosotis and Catherine Ringer. He has also written music for the theatre, including pieces performed at the Comédie Française. Desplat has conducted performances of his music played by the London Symphony Orchestra, the Royal Philharmonic Orchestra and the Munich Symphony Orchestra. Desplat has also given Master Classes at La Sorbonne in Paris and the Royal College of Music in London.

In 2007, he composed the scores for Philip Pullman's Golden Compass; Zach Helm's BAFTA nominated directorial debut Mr. Magorium's Wonder Emporium with American composer Aaron Zigman; and the Ang Lee movie Lust, Caution. Prior to these break-out works, he contributed scores for The Luzhin Defence, Girl with a Pearl Earring, Syriana, Birth, Hostage, Casanova and The Nest.

For The Painted Veil, he won the Golden Globe Award for Best Original Score, Los Angeles Film Critics Association Award for Best Music, and the 2006 World Soundtrack Award. He won the 2007 BMI Film Music Award, 2007 World Soundtrack Award, 2007 European Film Award, and received his first Academy Award nomination for Best Original Score for The Queen. He also won the Silver Berlin Bear at the Berlin Film Festival for Best Film Music in The Beat that My Heart Skipped. In 2008, Desplat received his second Oscar nomination for David Fincher's Curious Case of Benjamin Button. Desplat received his third Oscar nomination and a BAFTA nomination for Fantastic Mr. Fox in 2010, both of which were won by Michael Giacchino for Up.

Desplat has composed music for Largo Winch, based on the Belgian comic; Afterwards a French-Canadian psychological thriller film directed by Gilles Bourdos in English; Anne Fontaine's Coco avant Chanel, based on the life of designer Coco Chanel; Robert Guédiguian's L'Armée du Crime; Cheri, reuniting him with director Stephen Frears, whom he collaborated with on The Queen; Un Prophète reuniting with director Jacques Audiard; Julie & Julia directed by Nora Ephron; Fantastic Mr. Fox, directed by Wes Anderson and based on the novel by Roald Dahl; New Moon, directed by Chris Weitz; Roman Polanski's Ghost Writer; Tamara Drewe; The Special Relationship; and The King's Speech which earned Desplat his fourth Oscar nomination.

In early 2011, Desplat began to write the music to Harry Potter and the Deathly Hallows – Part 2. He reunited with director David Yates, who offered Desplat the opportunity to score the second part after his work on the Part 1 soundtrack in 2010 "enchanted everyone in the control room". Desplat's soundtrack sequel to the 2008 film Largo Winch was released in 2011 and was well received.
Desplat's 2011 projects included The Tree of Life, directed by Terrence Malick (which he actually recorded in early 2010), A Better Life, La Fille du Puisatier, Roman Polanski's Carnage, George Clooney's Ides of March, and the logo for the French film company StudioCanal.

Desplat started 2012 with Extremely Loud and Incredibly Close, the Florent Emilio Siri-directed biopic Cloclo, and DreamWorks Animation's Rise of the Guardians.  His other scores of 2013 included Rust and Bone, Zero Dark Thirty, and Argo, the latter of which earned him Oscar, Golden Globe and BAFTA nominations.

In June 2013, Desplat's first Concerto for Flute & Orchestra premiered in France with flautist Jean Ferrandis and the Orchestre National des Pays de la Loire conducted by John Axelrod. His Trois Etudes for piano originally written for pianist Lang Lang had its U.S. premiere in October 2013 played by pianist Gloria Cheng.  He received a sixth Oscar nomination for his score to Philomena, which marked his fourth collaboration with director Stephen Frears.

On 23 June 2014, it was announced that Desplat would head the jury at the 71st Venice International Film Festival.  He wrote five major scores during 2014, with The Grand Budapest Hotel winning him his first Academy Award. His score for The Imitation Game was also nominated, and his win therefore marked the first time a composer had won against another of their own scores since John Williams won for Star Wars (beating Close Encounters of the Third Kind) in 1978, and only the seventh time overall (Alfred Newman, Bernard Herrmann, Max Steiner, Miklos Rozsa and Johnny Green are the only other composers to achieve this).

On 16 March 2015, It was announced that Desplat would be composing the first anthology film of the new Disney Star Wars films, called Rogue One. In September 2016, he stepped down due to reshoots of the film, and was then replaced by Michael Giacchino.

In 2018, he won his second Academy Award for The Shape of Water and premiered a new work for solo flute played by Emmanuel Pahud.

2022 saw Desplat nominated for Best Original Score for The French Dispatch at the BAFTA Awards.

Filmography

English
 Film 

 Television

Other languages 
 Sous les pieds des femmes (1997) [France (original title)]
 A Monkey's Tale (1999) [Le Château des singes – France (original title)]
 Empty Days (1999) [Rien à faire – France (original title)]
 Une autre femme [France (original title)]
 Tous les chagrins se ressemblent (2002) [France (original title)]
 Paroles d'étoiles (2002) [France (original title)]
 Rire et châtiment  [France (original title)]
 Les baisers des autres (2003) [France (original title)]
 Le pacte du silence (2003) [France (original title)]
 Virus au paradis (2003) [France (original title)]
 Eager Bodies (2003) [Les corps impatients – France (original title)]
 Les beaux jours (2003) [France (original title)]
 A Sight for Sore Eyes (2003) [Inquiétudes – France (original title)]
 Le pays des enfants perdus (2004) [France (original title)]
 L'enquête Corse (2004) [France (original title)]
 Tu vas rire, mais je te quitte (2005) [France (original title)]
 The Beat That My Heart Skipped (2005) [De battre mon coeur s'est arrêté – France (original title)]
 Une aventure (2005)
 Lies & Alibis (2006) [The Alibi – Netherlands (original title)]
 The Valet (2006) [La doublure – France (original title)]
 Quand j'étais chanteur (2006) [France (original title)]
 L'Ennemi Intime (2007) – France (original title)
 Lust, Caution (2007) [Se, jie – China/USA/Taiwan (original title)]
 Michou d'Auber (2007) [France (original title)]
 Ségo et Sarko sont dans un bateau... (2007) [France (original title)]
 Largo Winch (2008)
 Coco Before Chanel (2009) [Coco avant Chanel – France (original title)]
 A Prophet (2009) [Un prophète – France (original title)]
 The Army of Crime (2009) [L'armée du crime – France (original title)]
 La Fille du Puisatier (2011) – France (original title)
 Largo Winch 2 (2011)
 Cloclo (2012)
 Reality (2012)
 Renoir (2012)
 Rust and Bone (2012) [De rouille et d'os – France (original title)]
 Venus in Fur (2013) [La Vénus à la fourrure – France (original title)]
 Marius (2013)
 Fanny (2013)
 Suite Francaise (2015) – Bruno's Piano Piece
 Don't Tell Me the Boy Was Mad (2015)
 Les Habitants (2016)
 The Odyssey (2016)
 Heal the Living (2016)
 12 jours (2017)
 Based on a True Story (2017) [D'après une histoire vraie – France (original title)]
 An Officer and a Spy (2019)
 Adults in the Room (2019)
 Eiffel (2021)
 Lui (2022)
 Father & Soldier (2022) [Tirailleurs – France/Senegal (original title)]
 The Palace (2023)

Accolades 

Desplat has received many awards and nominations for his work including two Academy Awards, three BAFTA Awards and two Golden Globe Awards.

Decorations 
 Officer of the Ordre national du Mérite (2016)
 Commander of the Order of Arts and Letters (2016)
 Chevalier of the Legion of Honour (2011)

References

External links

 Alexandre Desplat, official website 
 

1961 births
Living people
French classical composers
French film score composers
French male classical composers
French people of Greek descent
Greek film score composers
Academics of the Royal College of Music
Animated film score composers
Annie Award winners
French male film score composers
Musicians from Paris
Best Original Music BAFTA Award winners
Best Original Music Score Academy Award winners
Commandeurs of the Ordre des Arts et des Lettres
European Film Award for Best Composer winners
Golden Globe Award-winning musicians
Grammy Award winners
Varèse Sarabande Records artists